Hemiechinus is a genus of hedgehogs. It contains two species, found in Central and South Asia.

Species
 Long-eared hedgehog (Hemiechinus auritus)
 Indian long-eared hedgehog (Hemiechinus collaris)

References

 
Mammal genera
Taxa named by Leopold Fitzinger